Sociedad Química y Minera de Chile (SQM) is a Chilean chemical and mining company, who mines lithium and makes fertilizer and other chemicals.  The company is currently under indictment and investigation for diverting funds to different politicians in Chile.  
The SQM Case is closely related to the Penta Case, since defendants from both cases overlap and it is the same type of crime. So it's also called the Penta-SQM Case.  So far, 6 defendants have been charged.

This case includes tax fraud and violations of political campaign laws.  Different persons, either politicians or their advisers or even family members, created fake invoices which SQM then paid.  It is alleged that those who created these fake invoices then passed those funds onto political parties in violation of campaign finance laws.  So they were acting on behalf of the politicians, without the politicians being involved directly.  As to whether those funds bought any favors from the politicians for SQM, so far that has only been demonstrated in the case of Pablo Wagner, who was a former mining minister.  New charges (August 2015) brought against certain defendants now include steering contracts.

The principal stock holder of SQM is Julio Ponce Lerou, formerly son-in-law of the late dictator Pinochet. He is not charged with any wrong doing.

Charges brought against employees and owners of SQM

This case is different from the Penta Case in that false invoices the tax authorities (SII) were then used to funnel money to politicians on both sides of the political spectrum.  In the Penta Case, funds were diverted to right wing politicians of the RN and UDI parties.  In the SQM case, the members of the governing coalition, the Nueva Mayoria, received funds as well.

This case is still under investigation. The politicians under investigation are listed below.  In many cases payments were made to their assistants and not directly to the politicians.

Governing Coalition (Nueva Mayoria)

Others

Alliance (Conservative)

References